John William "Bud" Clancy (September 15, 1900 – September 26, 1968) was an American professional baseball first baseman. He played ten seasons in Major League Baseball (MLB) from 1924 to 1934 for the Chicago White Sox, Brooklyn Dodgers, and Philadelphia Phillies.

While playing for the White Sox in 1930, Clancy became the first first baseman since 1891 to record no putouts or assists in a nine inning game.

In 522 games over nine seasons, Clancy posted a .281 batting average (504-for-1796) with 204 runs, 69 doubles, 26 triples, 12 home runs, 198 RBIs, 111 bases on balls, .325 on-base percentage and .368 slugging percentage. He finished his career with a .992 fielding percentage as a first baseman.

References

External links

Major League Baseball first basemen
Brooklyn Dodgers players
Philadelphia Phillies players
Chicago White Sox players
Baseball players from Illinois
Boston Braves scouts
People from Odell, Illinois
Minor league baseball managers
1900 births
1968 deaths
Grand Rapids Billbobs players
Muskegon Anglers players
Little Rock Travelers players
Jersey City Skeeters players
Buffalo Bisons (minor league) players
Birmingham Barons players
Helena Seaporters players
Santa Barbara Saints players
Valdosta Trojans players